Blue Waters Hotel, located in Soldiers Bay, Antigua, was first opened in 1960 as The Blue Waters Beach Hotel by Osmond Kelsick, a Royal Air Force airman noted as the only Antiguan squadron leader in World War II.

The hotel opened with just 16 rooms however by 1984 the property had grown to 45 rooms and was sold to British businessman Ronald Randall.

Location

Blue Waters is situated on three secluded beaches in Soldiers Bay, a small cove known for its calm waters. The hotel is approximately 7.5 km by road from the capital of 
St Johns and approximately 12 km from V. C. Bird International Airport.

Features 
The resort features 3 restaurants, serving a mix of local and international cuisine. The property also holds a wedding licence, allowing ceremonies to take place within the grounds.

Hurricane Luis
In 1995 the hotel was severely damaged by Hurricane Luis and was closed to undergo extensive refurbishment costing $9 million. The hotel re-opened in November 1998.

50th Anniversary 
2012 marks Blue Waters 50th year of operation, thereby making it one of the longest established hotels on the island of Antigua.

Awards
Blue Waters has received the following awards:

Antigua and Barbuda's Leading Hotel: 2012, 2010, 2006

The Queen's Diamond Jubilee Award: 2012 The hotel was one of only 2 companies to be awarded this accolade which was given for Blue Waters' significant contribution to Antigua during its 50 years of business on the island.

Trip Advisor Certificate of Excellence: 2012

Charity
Blue Waters works closely with Starlight, a charity aimed at improving the lives of seriously and terminally ill children by granting them once in a lifetime experiences. Blue Waters has sponsored the Starlight Highclere Clay Pigeon Shooting Challenge since it began in 2003.

References

External links
 

Buildings and structures in Saint John Parish, Antigua and Barbuda
Tourism in Antigua and Barbuda
Hotels established in 1960
1960s establishments in Antigua and Barbuda